Metepa is a chemosterilant, with the capability to restrict ovarian development. Metepa can also result in carcinogenesis, in particular the formation of teratomas. It is sometimes used as a Rocket propellant.

References

Flame retardants
Pesticides
Phosphoramides
Aziridines